Andreja Mladenović is a Serbian politician. He was the deputy mayor of Belgrade from 2014 to 2018 and is currently one of the city's three assistant mayors. For many years a prominent member of the Democratic Party of Serbia (Demokratska stranka Srbije, DSS), he was expelled from the party in 2015 and subsequently founded his own Independent Democratic Party of Serbia (Samostalna Demokratska stranka Srbije, Samostalni DSS). He is now the leader of the Independent Serbian Party (Samostalna Srpska Stranka).

Early life and private career
Mladenović was born in Belgrade, in what was then the Socialist Republic of Serbia in the Socialist Federal Republic of Yugoslavia. He has a master's degree from the Faculty of International Engineering Management at the European University in Belgrade and has enrolled in doctoral studies at the same institution.

Political career

Democratic Party of Serbia
Mladenović was a member of the Zemun municipal assembly and deputy mayor of the municipality from 2000 to 2004, with responsibility for sports and youth, refugees and social issues, and relations with religious communities. He was subsequently elected to the Assembly of the City of Belgrade in the 2004 city election after receiving the second position on the DSS's list. The DSS participated in the city's coalition government after the election, and Mladenović was appointed to city council (i.e., the executive branch of municipal government) with responsibility for sports and youth.

DSS spokesperson in the first Koštunica ministry
Mladenović received the fifty-seventh position (out of 250) on the DSS's electoral list in the 2003 Serbian parliamentary election. The list won fifty-three mandates, and he was not selected for its assembly delegation. (From 2000 to 2011, Serbian parliamentary mandates were awarded to sponsoring parties or coalitions rather than to individual candidates, and it was common practice for the mandates to be awarded out of numerical order. Mladenović could have been awarded a mandate despite his relatively low position, although in the event he was not.) He was appointed as media spokesperson for the party in 2004. The DSS emerged from the election at the head of a coalition government, with party leader Vojislav Koštunica as prime minister.

Following the 2004 Kosovo parliamentary election, which was largely boycotted by Serbs in the aftermath of anti-Serb violence earlier in the year in the disputed region, Mladenović said that Kosovo Serbs would never accept a multi-ethnic governance agreement "that gives them only the right to vote." He added that the Serbian government would continue to negotiate its own plan for resolving the status of Kosovo and Metohija with the international community. In April 2005, he rejected outright a plan by the International Commission on the Balkans for the gradual independence of Kosovo.

Mladenović said in January 2005 that Sreten Lukić would surrender voluntarily to the International Criminal Tribunal for the Former Yugoslavia (ICTY) in The Hague to face charges of war crimes. He added that the DSS supported the principle of voluntary surrender for ICTY indictees and opposed a policy of arrests.

He later criticized the European Union (EU)'s pressure tactics to persuade Serbia to surrender prominent suspects such as Radovan Karadžić and Ratko Mladić (both of whose whereabouts were unknown at the time), saying, "What will [additional conditions on Serbia's bid for EU membership] bring if Mladić is dead? What if he has left the country?" Notwithstanding this, he later said that Serbia was co-operating with the ICTY in hunting for Mladić and other suspects, and that he was confident they would be extradited to the ICTY immediately after being located on Serbian territory. He rejected charges that Serbia's security forces needed to be "purged" to facilitate the extradition of Mladić and others, saying that "a serious country would never allow anyone from outside to dictate the country's most important positions. That would mean that we are not a country, but a colony."

The National Assembly of Serbia observed a moment of silence for all victims of the 1990s Yugoslav Wars on 11 July 2005; critics noted that the ceremony did not include specific reference to the victims of the 1995 Srebrenica massacre. Mladenović stated on this occasion, "Serbia has an interest in exposing and condemning all war crimes in the history of the former Yugoslavia, in which the Serbian people were the biggest victims."

In August 2006, United Nations Special Envoy for Kosovo Martti Ahtisaari's was quoted as saying that Serbs were culpable as a people for crimes committed in the Kosovo War. Mladenović described this statement as "scandalous, shameful, and racist." In November of the same year, he asked for Ahtisaari's resignation. He supported the protests of Kosovo Serbs against Ahtisaari's plan for the final resolution of the status of Kosovo in February 2007, describing the actions of the community as democratic and legitimate. The following month, he described a revised version of Ahtisaari's plan as "worse than the previous one," stating that it, "fully corresponds with the stance of the Albanian separatists."

DSS spokesperson in the second Koštunica ministry
The 2007 Serbian parliamentary election did not produce a clear winner, and an unstable coalition government was eventually formed, led by the DSS and the rival Democratic Party (Demokratska stranka, DS). Koštunica continued to serve as prime minister. Mladenović, who provided regular media updates during the negotiations for a new government, remained the DSS's media spokesperson, although from July 2007 he shared this responsibility with Branislav Ristivojević.

In September 2007, Mladenović said that Serbian Army forces would not be deployed to international missions in either Afghanistan or Iraq. In November 2007, he said that a new European Union (EU) mission to Kosovo and Metohija would be unacceptable for Serbia prior to the resolution of the disputed area's status.

The DSS offered to support DS incumbent Boris Tadić in the second round of the 2008 Serbian presidential election if Tadić agreed to abandon Serbia's Stabilization and Association Agreement with the European Union in the event of the EU sending a new mission to Kosovo. Tadić rejected the offer, and the DSS remained neutral in the runoff vote between Tadić and Tomislav Nikolić. Mladenović stated that Tadić and the DS were to blame for the DSS's neutrality, stressing that the DSS proposal was a legitimate offer and not a form of blackmail. Tadić won a narrow victory in the election despite the absence of a DSS endorsement.

Kosovo's unilateral declaration of independence in 2008 and its subsequent recognition by EU countries created a crisis for the DSS–DS government. Mladenović expressed the DSS's view that Serbia should hold a referendum on whether the country should continue its efforts to join the EU "with or without Kosovo." He added that "official policy thus far has been that Kosovo is Serbia and that we will join the EU with Kosovo as a constituent part." The crisis ultimately led to the breakdown of the coalition government and to early elections in 2008. The DSS contested the election on a joint list with New Serbia, and Mladenović received the sixty-second position on their combined list. Boris Tadić announced during the campaign that he would sign the Stabilization and Association Agreement with the EU; Mladenović responded by saying, "his signature is not the signature of Serbia. He is in fact putting a seal of Judas of his party coalition to the [agreement]."

The 2008 election again failed to produce a clear winner. The DSS–NS alliance won thirty seats, and Mladenović indicated that it would not negotiate with any pro-EU parties for a new coalition government. The DSS came close to forming a new government with the far-right Serbian Radical Party and the Socialist Party of Serbia, during which time Mladenović again provided regular updates on the status of negotiations. The talks between the parties ultimately failed, and the Socialists instead formed a coalition government with the For a European Serbia alliance led by the DS. The DSS moved into opposition, and Mladenović did not participate in the party's assembly delegation.

At the municipal level, Mladenović was re-elected to the city assembly in the 2008 Belgrade election after being included on a combined DSS–NS list, which won twelve mandates (out of 110). Mirroring developments at the republic level, the DSS held talks with the Radicals and Socialists for a new municipal government, and Mladenović indicated that the DSS would be ready to support Radical Aleksandar Vučić as mayor. Mladenović, Vučić, and Milan Krkobabić (representing the Socialist alliance) announced an agreement for a new municipal government on 28 May 2008, and rumours circulated that Mladenović would become deputy mayor. This arrangement fell apart when the DS and Socialists agreed to a coalition at the republic level, which was subsequently repeated at the municipal level. The DSS moved into opposition in Belgrade, and Mladenović led the DSS group in the municipal assembly.

DSS spokesperson in opposition
In July 2008, Mladenović announced that the DSS would support a rally organized by the Radical Party against the recent arrest of Radovan Karadžić. The following month, he said that Russia's recognition of the independence of Abkhazia and South Ossetia was a reaction to the recognition of Kosovo's independence by the western powers.

Mladenović announced in November 2008 that the DSS had signed a new co-operation agreement with New Serbia and Maja Gojković's People's Party, and that the parties would fight for "enduring democratic principles and national values." In June 2009, he said that the DSS was prepared to align itself with the newly established Serbian Progressive Party to form new administrations in the Belgrade municipalities of Zemun and Voždovac. He appears to have stood down as DSS media spokesperson in early 2010.

Later years (2010–15)
Serbia's electoral system was reformed in 2011, such that parliamentary mandates were awarded in numerical order to candidates on successful lists. Mladenović received the forty-fourth position on the DSS's electoral list in the 2012 Serbian parliamentary election. The list won twenty-one mandates, and he was not elected. He received the second position on the DSS's list in the concurrent 2012 Belgrade city election, and was re-elected when the list won ten mandates. The DS and Socialists initially maintained their municipal coalition agreement following the election, and the DSS again served in opposition. In late 2013, the party participated in a key vote of non-confidence that forced the resignation of mayor Dragan Đilas. The government of Serbia dissolved the Belgrade assembly in November 2013 pending new elections, and Mladenović was appointed to the city's provisional authority.

Mladenović was promoted to the tenth position on the DSS's list in the 2014 Serbian parliamentary election, in which the party failed to cross the electoral threshold to win representation in the assembly. He again received the second position on the party's list for the Belgrade assembly in the concurrent 2014 city election and was re-elected when the list won nine mandates. The Progressive Party won a majority in the municipal elections, and Siniša Mali became the city's new mayor. On Mali's proposal, Mladenović was elected by the assembly as the city's deputy mayor.

Independent Democratic Party of Serbia
Mladenović and six other DSS members of the Belgrade assembly were expelled from the party in July 2015 by leader Sanda Rašković Ivić, on the grounds that they were attempting to turn the DSS into a satellite of Aleksandar Vučić's Progressive Party. Mladenović subsequently created a breakaway party called the Independent Democratic Party of Serbia and entered into negotiations with the Progressives for an alliance at both the republic level and in Belgrade. He was included in the tenth position on the Progressive Party's coalition list in the 2016 Serbian parliamentary election and was elected to the assembly when the list won a majority victory with 131 out of 250 mandates. His term in this office was brief; he could not hold a dual mandate as a member of the National Assembly and deputy mayor of Belgrade, and he resigned his seat on 3 October 2016. He was the party's sole representative in the National Assembly during this time and appears to have been its only candidate on Vučić's electoral list; his replacement in the assembly was Radoslav Jović of the Progressives.

Mladenović was re-elected to a fifth term in the Belgrade assembly in the 2018 city election after receiving the eighth position on the Progressive Party's coalition list, which won a majority victory with sixty-four out of 110 mandates. His endorsement was from the Progressive Party, although he was not a party member. He subsequently served as acting mayor of Belgrade from 28 May to 7 June 2018, following Siniša Mali's resignation to accept a cabinet position and before Zoran Radojičić's confirmation as his replacement. After Radojičić's took office as mayor, Mladenović was re-assigned as one of the city's three new assistant mayors, along with Aleksandar Marković and Aco Petrović.

Independent Serbian Party
The Independent Democratic Party of Serbia merged with Movement for the Development of Serbia and the National Democratic Political Council in February 2020 to form a new party called the Independent Serbian Party. Mladenović was chosen as the party's first leader.

References

1975 births
Living people
Politicians from Belgrade
Members of the National Assembly (Serbia)
Members of the City Assembly of Belgrade
Democratic Party of Serbia politicians
Independent Democratic Party of Serbia politicians
Independent Serbian Party politicians